Pregnin is a hamlet administratively part of the Saint-Genis-Pouilly commune in the Ain département, France. It is also home Les Lutins de Pregnin, an organisation that funds local schools and organises community events.

References 

Villages in Auvergne-Rhône-Alpes